Bertus Freese (20 February 1902 – 21 November 1959) was a Dutch footballer. He competed in the men's tournament at the 1928 Summer Olympics. During his career, he played for Heracles where he was part of the title-winning team in 1926–27.

Honours
Heracles
Netherlands Football League Championship: 1926–27

References

External links
 
 
 

1902 births
1959 deaths
Dutch footballers
Netherlands international footballers
Olympic footballers of the Netherlands
Footballers at the 1928 Summer Olympics
Sportspeople from Almelo
Association football forwards
Heracles Almelo players
Footballers from Overijssel